McCaleb Burnett (born November 1977) is an American actor, known for his roles Citizen Baines and Immigration Tango. Born in New York City, he graduated from Brown University and the New York University Tisch School of the Arts. Burnett has also appeared in theatre productions.

Filmography

Film

Television

References 

1977 births
Living people
Actors from New York (state)
Actors from New York City
Brown University alumni
New York University alumni